Airball is a video game released in 1987 by Microdeal. It was programmed by Ed Scio, with graphics by Pete Lyon, music by Paul Shields, and level design by Pete Scott. Lyon was the artist for other Microdeal games in the late 1980s, such as Goldrunner.. The game was released for the Dragon 32/64 and TRS-80 Color Computer, with ports following for the Atari ST, Amiga, MS-DOS, Atari 8-bit family, and Game Boy Advance.  Airball was ported to the Apple IIGS, but fewer than 150 copies were sold.  A version for the Nintendo Entertainment System from Novotrade and Tengen was cancelled.

Gameplay

The player begins every round atop inflating stations. These inflating stations, which are scattered throughout the arenas, also act as checkpoints. Remaining atop an inflating station for too long will cause the player to burst. A bar gauge at the bottom of the screen allows the player to monitor their air level.

Navigating the levels is accomplished with the directional buttons and a jump button. The view is isometric, which can often make complicated movements (such as jumping across gaps or weaving through obstacles) difficult. Points are gathered in the form of gems that appear randomly in rooms. Players pass through the gems for collection.

Airball can ascend stairs by jumping. The surrounding spikes, one of many obstacles found in the game, cause the player to burst. The yellow bar is the amount of air left in the ball, and the three balls in the lower left of the screen indicate the remaining lives.

Reception
Calling Airball "one of the strangest games I've ever played", David Plotkin of STart liked its graphics and soundtrack. He recommended it to "those with steady nerves and a sense of adventure".

References

1987 video games
Amiga games
Apple IIGS games
Atari 8-bit family games
Atari ST games
DOS games
Dragon 32 games
Game Boy Advance games
Marble games
TRS-80 Color Computer games
Unauthorized video games
Video games developed in the United Kingdom
Video games with isometric graphics